In the Summer of His Years is a studio album recorded by American entertainer Connie Francis.

Background
The album's title song was performed first by Millicent Martin when the BBC aired a tribute to John F. Kennedy after the tragic events in Dallas on November 22, 1963.

While Mahalia Jackson had recorded the song already on November 29, 1963, Connie Francis recorded her own version on December 2, 1963, followed by its immediate release. The arrangement was provided by Claus Ogerman who also conducted the recording.

The subsequent album of the same name was filled with material that had been released on previous singles and albums and was considered suitable to serve as memorial songs for John F. Kennedy as well as for J. D. Tippit, a policeman who had also been slain that day in Dallas. All the proceeds of the album were donated to Tippit's family.

Track listing

Side A

Side B

References

External links
Official Connie Francis Fan Club Site

Connie Francis albums
MGM Records albums
1963 albums
Albums arranged by Claus Ogerman
Albums produced by Danny Davis (country musician)